William Powlett (c. 1693–1757), of Chilbolton and Easton, Hampshire, was a British landowner and Whig politician who sat in the House of Commons between 1729 and 1757.

Powlett was the eldest son of Lord William Powlett and his first wife Louisa, daughter of Armand-Nompar de Caumont, Marquis de Montpouillon, and granddaughter of Henri-Nompar de Caumont, 3rd Duc de La Force. He matriculated at Wadham College, Oxford on 27 October 1710, aged 17.  In 1718 and again in 1721, he was Mayor of Lymington.  He married Lady Annabella Bennet, daughter of Charles Bennet, 1st Earl of Tankerville, on 10 February 1721.  In 1729, he succeeded to the estates of his father.

Powlett was returned as Member of Parliament for Lynington on the interest of his cousin, Charles Powlett, 3rd Duke of Bolton, at a contested by-election 13 May 1729. He supported the Government until 1734, when he followed the Duke into opposition, voting against the Government on the repeal of the Septennial Act. He stood unsuccessfully at Winchester at the 1734 British general election  but was returned at the  1741 British general election after a contest.  He voted against the Government until 1746, when he voted with them on the Hanoverians. He was defeated at Winchester at the 1747 British general election and again at a by-election in 1751.

At the 1754 British general election, Powlett  was returned unopposed for Whitchurch on the interest of his brother-in-law, John Wallop Lord Portsmouth.

Powlett died on 28 February 1757 leaving a son and daughter. His daughter Annabella married Rev. Richard Smyth of Itchen and was the mother of William Powlett Powlett. His brother Charles Armand Powlett was also an MP.

References

1690s births
1757 deaths
Members of the Parliament of Great Britain for English constituencies
British MPs 1727–1734
British MPs 1741–1747
British MPs 1747–1754
British MPs 1754–1761
William